Zardughan (also Romanized as Zardūghān) is a village in Peyghan Chayi Rural District, in the Central District of Kaleybar County, East Azerbaijan Province, Iran. In the 2006 census, its population was 66, in 12 families.

References 

Populated places in Kaleybar County